Bostwick may refer to:

People with the name Bostwick

Surname
Bostwick family of New York
Albert C. Bostwick, Jr. (1901–1980), steeplechase jockey and racehorse owner
Dorothy Stokes Bostwick (1899–2001), American heiress and artist
Dunbar Bostwick (1908–2006), American businessman, hockey player, and horseman
Jabez A. Bostwick (1830–1892), American businessman and founding partner of Standard Oil
Lillian Bostwick Phipps (1906–1987), American socialite and racehorse owner
Pete Bostwick (1909–1982), American tennis and polo player and jockey
Arthur Elmore Bostwick (1860–1942), American librarian and author
Barry Bostwick (born 1945), American actor and singer
Frank Matteson Bostwick (1857–1945), American flag officer of the U.S. Navy
Jackson Bostwick (born 1943), American actor
Janet Bostwick (born 1939), Bahamian lawyer and politician
John Bostwick (1780–1849), Canadian surveyor, businessman, and politician
Michael Bostwick (born 1988), English professional football player
Sarah Bostwick (born 1979), American visual artist
Scott Bostwick (1961–2011), American college football coach

Given name
Robert Bostwick Carney (1895–1990), American admiral in the United States Navy
Samuel Bostwick Garvin (1811–1878), American lawyer and politician
Floyd Bostwick Odlum (1892–1976), American lawyer and industrialist
William Bostwick Sheppard (1860–1934), United States federal judge

Places
Bostwick, Florida, United States
Bostwick, Georgia, United States
Bostwick, Nebraska, United States
Bostwick, Ohio, United States

Other uses
Bostwick (Bladensburg, Maryland), historic house in Maryland; listed on the National Register of Historic Places (NRHP)
Bostwick Railroad (1907–1912), short-lived railroad in Georgia, U.S.
Bostwick School, historic school in Bostwick, Florida; listed on the NRHP
USS Bostwick (DE-103), Cannon-class destroyer escort of the U.S. Navy (1943–1946)

See also
 Bostock
 "Boswick the Clown", character and identity portrayed by American actor David Magidson

English-language surnames